Pat Fielding (27 November 1875 – 5 August 1959) was an Irish hurler who played as a midfielder for the Kilkenny senior team.

Fielding made his first appearance for the team during the 1900 championship and was a regular member of the starting for the next few seasons until his retirement after the 1904 championship. During that time he won one All-Ireland medal and three Leinster medals.

References

1875 births
1959 deaths
Mooncoin hurlers
Kilkenny inter-county hurlers
All-Ireland Senior Hurling Championship winners